The American Sportscopter Ultrasport 254 is an American helicopter that was designed and produced by American Sportscopter and first flown in July 1993. The aircraft was produced by Light's American Sportscopter Inc from 1999. The aircraft was supplied as a kit for amateur construction.

Design and development
It features a single main rotor, an enclosed cockpit with a windshield, skid-type landing gear and a twin cylinder, air-cooled, two-stroke, single-ignition  Hirth 2703 engine.

The aircraft fuselage fairing is made from composites. Its  diameter main rotor employs an ATI 012 (VR-7 mod) airfoil at the blade root, becoming an ATI 008 (VR-7 mod) at the tip. The main and tail rotor blades are of honeycomb composite construction. The cyclic control is roof-mounted, hanging down into the cockpit, but is otherwise conventional. The  diameter tail rotor features a shrouded tail rotor and a tailplane with end-fins.

When it was available, the aircraft could be purchased as a 150-hour assembly kit or as a 60-hour quick-build kit. No plans were available.

Specifications (Ultrasport 254)

See also
List of rotorcraft

References

Ultrasport 254
1990s United States sport aircraft
1990s United States helicopters
Homebuilt aircraft
Single-engined piston helicopters